This is the list of Belgian Senators from 1995 till 1999.

Election results (21 May 1995)

Seat division

By type

Senators by Right

Directly elected senators

Dutch electoral college (25)

French electoral college (15)

Community senators

Flemish Community (10)

French-speaking Community (10)

German-language Community (1)

Coopted senators

Dutch language group (6)

French language group (4)

References

1990s in Belgium